The Rashtravadi Janata Party (Nationalist Peoples Party), is a political party in India. The RJP is led by party president Anil Bharati.

References

Political parties in India